Piambra is rural locality of Warrumbungle Shire Council and a civil parish of Napier County. 
 
Piambra is also a location on the Gwabegar railway line in north-western New South Wales, Australia. A Railway station was located there between 1914 and 1974.

References

Localities in New South Wales